The 2009–10 season was the 42nd season for the Northern Premier League Premier Division, and the third season for the Northern Premier League Division One North and South.

For Sponsorship reasons, the leagues were more formally known as the Unibond Premier, Unibond 1st Division North and Unibond 1st Division South

This was the last season that the three Northern Premier League divisions were sponsored by Henkel Unibond, ending a record 17 seasons relationship.

The final allocations of teams following the 2008–09 season was released on 29 May 2009. With the restructuring of the national league system complete, all three divisions of the Northern Premier League had their full complement of twenty-two teams until the withdrawal of Newcastle Blue Star (see below).

Premier Division

The Premier Division featured seven new clubs:
Burscough, relegated from the Conference North
Hucknall Town, relegated from the Conference North
King's Lynn, demoted under stadium quality rules from the Conference North
Durham City, promoted from NPL Division One North
Newcastle Blue Star, promoted via play-offs from NPL Division One North
Retford United, promoted from NPL Division One South
Stocksbridge Park Steels, promoted via play-offs from NPL Division One South

League table

Results

Play-offs

* After extra time

Stadia and locations

Division One North

The Division One North featured three new clubs:
AFC Fylde, promoted as champions from the NWCFL Premier Division
Leigh Genesis, relegated from the NPL Premier Division
Prescot Cables, relegated from the NPL Premier Division

League table

Results

Play-offs

Division One South

The Division One South featured five new clubs:
Witton Albion, relegated from the NPL Premier Division
Cammell Laird, demoted under stadium quality rules from the NPL Premier Division
Chasetown, transferred from the Southern League Division One Midlands
Mickleover Sports, promoted as champions from the Northern Counties East League Premier Division
Market Drayton, promoted as champions from the Midland Football Alliance

League table

Results

Play-offs

Resignations and their effects
On 20 June 2009, three days following the league's AGM which confirmed the 2009–10 allocation, Newcastle Blue Star resigned from the league. As division placements had been confirmed be then, no replacement team could be entered and the Premier Division was reduced to twenty one teams for the season.

On 9 December 2009, King's Lynn were officially wound up by the High Court in London over debts and an overdue tax bill, and they will play no further games in the season. The League released a table on 21 December with King's Lynn's playing record expunged from it, and leaving the Premier Division with twenty clubs and only two relegation spots. Then, in March 2010 Chester City F.C. and Farsley Celtic A.F.C. were removed from the Conference National and Conference North respectively.

Promotion from the First Divisions to the Premier Division took place as planned. Relegation from the First Divisions to the county level was reduced from the planned two per division to one. Relegation from the Premier Division was reduced from two to one on account of developments in the Conference.  The final decision on relegations were made during the close season by the FA's National League System Committee which left this method completely redundant as Chester City, Farsley Celtic (now Farsley A.F.C.), King's Lynn, Grays Athletic (lost their ground), Merthyr Tydfil (expelled), VCD Athletic (ground grade fail) and Rothwell Town (resigned) were all demoted to Level 8.

Cup results
Challenge Cup: Teams from all 3 divisions.

Boston United 2–0 Retford United

President's Cup: Teams from lower 2 divisions.

Belper Town 3–1 Stamford

Chairman's Cup: Between Champions of NPL Division One North and NPL Division One South.

Halifax 2–2 Mickleover, Mickleover win 3–1 on Pens

Peter Swales Shield

The Peter Swales Shield has changed format several times, and the 2010 version saw the champions of the 2009–10 NPL Premier Division, Guiseley, play against the winners of the 2010 NPL Chairman's Cup, North Ferriby United. It was decided before the match that no extra time would be played and would go straight to penalties after regulation.  Guiseley won the game 5–3 on penalties after a 1–1 draw after 90 minutes.

References

External links
Official website
Official Northern Premier League Match Photo Gallery

Northern Premier League seasons
7